The Teeling Column was one of four armed units created by Seán Cronin for the Border Campaign in the west of Ulster.

On 30 December 1956, the Column's inaugural operation involved an attack on the Royal Ulster Constabulary barracks in Derrylin, County Fermanagh. The object was to obtain the surrender of the garrison. The unit failed to achieve this and, fearing being outflanked by reinforcements, withdrew across the border to County Cavan.

The next day, the column's commander Noel Kavanagh and six others (including Ruairí Ó Brádaigh) were arrested in Cavan by Garda Síochána officers. All members of the Column were eventually imprisoned.

Ó Brádaigh was gaoled for six months in Mountjoy Prison, and the others were sent to Bridewell Prison.

Members
Noel Kavanagh, Dublin, Column Commander
Ruairí Ó Brádaigh, 2nd in command.
Pat MacManus, Kinawley, County Fermanagh
John Joe Ruane, Athenry, County Galway
Paddy Hannify, Athenry, County Galway
Willie Folan, Galway city
Peadar Murray, Newport, County Mayo
Joe Daly, Navan, County Meath
Dermot Blake, Navan, County Meath
Pat McGirl, Aughavas, County Leitrim
Paddy Duffy, Derrinacrieve, Tullyhaw, County Cavan
Leo Collins, Navan, County Meath 
Des Clarke, Navan, County Meath

References
Sabhat and Ó hAnluain Killed in Action;Saoirse-Irish Freedom January 2007

Irish Republican Army (1922–1969)
History of the Republic of Ireland
History of Northern Ireland